Uncial 076 (in the Gregory-Aland numbering), α1008 (Soden), is a Greek uncial manuscript of the New Testament, dated palaeographically to the 5th or 6th-century. Formerly it was labeled by יa.

Description 

Survived only one parchment leaf (17 cm by 15 cm). The codex is written in two columns per page, 23 lines per page, 9-10 letters per line. It contains a part of the Acts of the Apostles (2:11-22) with some missing words or letters. It used breathings and accents. The nomina sacra are abbreviated. The Old Testament quotations are marked by inverted comma (>).

Text 

The Greek text of this codex is a representative of the Alexandrian text-type with some alien readings. Aland placed it in Category II. 
The most interesting readings occurs in 2:13 where fragment supports Codex Bezae against all other manuscripts.

History 

Currently it is dated by the INTF to the 5th or 6th century.

The manuscript once belonged to Lord Amherst in Norfolk. In 1908/1909 Lord Amherst sold his library.

The codex is located now in the Pierpont Morgan Library (Pap. G. 8) at New York City.

See also 

 List of New Testament uncials
 Biblical manuscript
 Textual criticism

References

Further reading 

 B. P. Grenfell and A. S. Hunt, The Amherst Papyri, being an account of the Greek Papyri in the collection of Lord Amherst of Hackney at Didlington Hall, Norfolk I (London 1900), pp. 41–43.

Greek New Testament uncials
6th-century biblical manuscripts
Amherst papyri
Collection of the Morgan Library & Museum